Percentage rent, or a percentage lease, is a type of lease seen in commercial real estate. It is a rental charge based on the gross income of the tenant rather than a fixed monthly or annual value. In most examples, the percent rent only applies after a certain amount of base rent has been paid. The amount where the percentage rent begins to apply is known as the breakpoint. Some leases may be purely percent based and have no base component, but such cases are not common. Percent rent is normally considered an additional rent term.

For example, if a tenant has a base rent of $1,000 per month, and a percentage rent of 5% of income on an annualized basis, then the natural breakpoint is (12 x 1,000) / 5% = $240,000. That means the tenant will pay only base rent until they have an annual income greater than $240,000, although they may agree to some other breakpoint value as part of the lease negotiation. If their income surpasses the breakpoint, the percent rent is only the portion that has not already paid. In this example, if the tenant were to have an annual income of $260,000, they would owe (260,000 - 240,000) x 5% = $1000 percent rent, and thus their total rent for the year would be $12,000 + $1000 = $13,000.

Percent rent is common in retail settings, where the month-to-month income is highly variable and many tenants may make the majority of their income in the one or two months around the holiday shopping season. In these cases, the landlord can offer a lease with a base rent that is far below fair market value, but still within the tenant's capabilities to pay during the "lean times". Any potential losses are then made up with the percentage term. This often appeals to the tenant, as it means their rent scales with their own success.

Percent rent may also be used for new tenants whose business are just being set up. In this case, the tenant may need a very large space, like a warehouse or factory, but does not expect to see profits for an extended period of time. In these examples, it is common to have several breakpoints with a reduced percentage as sales increase, say 5% for the first million in sales, 4% for sales between 1 and 10 million, and then 3% for all sales over 10 million.

References
 
 
 

Commercial real estate